Magdalena "Maggie" de la Riva (born September 3, 1942), a 24-year-old actress and host, was abducted from in front of her home in New Manila, Quezon City on June 26, 1967, by four men, all of whom were sons of influential families, and taken to a motor hotel where she was abused and raped.

Her rape case became one of the most publicized cases in Philippine history.

Maggie de la Riva 
Maggie de la Riva was born in Manila to Pilar Torrente (Spanish mestiza) and Juan de la Riva (German Swiss).

In 1958, Riva completed her elementary and high school at Miriam College (then known as Maryknoll College) and finished secretarial training in 1960 at Saint Theresa's College.  In 1963, she was selected as one of the top five finalists for the beauty pageant Miss Caltex of 1963. In that same year, Riva also represented Filipino gowns for the Fashion Guild of the Philippines under the designer "Millie's Gowns". In 1964, she was hired as a brand promoter for "Respect the Centavo", a savings advertisement. Before she became an actress she was a ballet dancer.

As a movie actress, she was paid ₱8,000 per picture. At ABS-CBN, she performed in radio broadcasts and television shows (₱800 per month in permanent shows, ₱300 per month in live promotional shows, and ₱100–200 per appearance as a guest in other shows). She was the sole breadwinner of the family after the death of her father, Juan. Her mother took care of the family.

She first appeared with Joseph Estrada in Istambay (English: Bystander). It was Estrada that gave her a break in becoming a star. Her most memorable role was in Ang Langit ay para sa Lahat, which she considers her best work. She was also a singer and was always a guest in the leading nightclubs in Manila. She had her own TV show titled Maggie on ABS 3. She was also a guest artist in Tanghalan sa Darigold and a recurring guest in Tindahan sa Nayon in VG Television Production on MBC 11.

Perpetrators 
The four perpetrators, all of whom were from wealthy and influential families, consisted of the following:

Trial 
De la Riva moved from her home in New Manila to a safehouse in Camp Crame after she was threatened. The trial began on July 11, 1967, in the Quezon City Court of First Instance (the predecessor to the Regional Trial Court), presided by Lourdes Paredes San Diego.

Pineda claimed that they had raped and assaulted de la Riva as retribution for hitting their car. In addition, he claimed to have bribed de la Riva for ₱1,000 for a striptease, asserting that she willingly complied.

On October 2, 1967, the Court found the accused guilty of committing forcible abduction with rape under Article 335 of the Revised Penal Code of the Philippines and sentenced them to death by electric chair, along with a ₱10,000 penalty each to indemnify de la Riva.

Appeals and execution of the convicted

Imprisonment and appeals 
The four men were sent to Muntinlupa National Penitentiary while their appeals were being heard. While in prison, they met an American missionary named Olga Robertson, who resided outside the prison complex and devoted most of her time to prison ministry. Olga visited the three condemned men and requested that they memorize the Bible verse John 14:6. Three months later, she visited the men again but she discovered that they were no longer interested in spiritual things. Determined to save the souls of the men, she returned the day before their scheduled execution. Aquino quickly recited John 14:6 while Jaime José was faint with grief and fear.

On December 28, 1970, Rogelio Canal died from a drug overdose, two years before the executions. In a per curiam judgment in G.R. No. L-28232 on February 6, 1971, the Supreme Court modified the RTC decision, to declare the following:

Executions 
The remaining three assailants were executed by electric chair on May 17, 1972, by direct order of Philippine President Ferdinand Marcos, while the actual proceedings were broadcast on national radio.

On the day of their execution, the condemned ate a breakfast of fried chicken with bread and coffee, then had their heads shaved at 10:00 a.m. Their last meal was a lunch of rice, kare-kare, chicken tinola, lobster, crispy pata, lechon, fried lapu-lapu, and ice cream. The condemned were said to have been weeping uncontrollably during a radio interview.

Early in the afternoon, Olga Robertson brought other inmates who sang hymns of praise to encourage the three condemned men. Nine doctors administered to the condemned before they entered the electric chair chamber.

At their execution, a horde of reporters was divided into three groups to witness each execution.

Jaime José was the first to enter the death chamber. As he was strapped to the chair, he entered a state of shock after being sedated. He spent his final moments weeping as his face was covered with a leather mask, his bare feet resting on a wet block of quarry stone. Among the witnesses was his father, José, who had promised his son that he would be present in his final moments. His mother, Dolores, was at Malacanang Palace for a private audience with the President to appeal for a pardon, which Marcos declined because of the widespread public anger over the incident. José was executed when three prison guards activated switches to the electric chair, of which only one was the live switch. After the initial shock, when the prison doctor found him to be still alive, it was debated whether he should be taken back to his cell since the first shock didn't kill him. He was given another application of current and was pronounced dead at 3:20 p.m.

Basílio Pineda, the second to be executed, was forcibly dragged to the death chamber and was pronounced dead at 3:55 p.m.

The final convict to be executed, Edgardo Aquino, was the only condemned who appeared to show remorse for the crime. A prison chaplain, head of the prison guards, and a doctor heard his last words: "Avoid bad companions and obey your parents". He was pronounced dead at 4:10 p.m.

Olga believes that the three men went from the executioner's chair into the arms of their Savior and that Aquino triumphantly said, "Lord Jesus, I give you my life and no one can take it from me".

The three men's bodies were then taken to the Bilibid Hospital morgue for final identification and were claimed the next day by the relatives. José's funeral had his casket closed for the entire duration of the wake until his burial.

Aftermath and legacy 
The criminal proceedings and execution announcements of each of the accused were broadcast on public radio station DZRH, causing sensationalism and public hysteria. De la Riva's ordeal pioneered the subject of rape in the Philippines.

On March 6, 2017, De la Riva maintained on Philippine national television that the death penalty should still be a part of the judicial conviction of rape and assault cases. The death penalty had been abolished by President Gloria Macapagal-Arroyo in 2006.

At present, the hotel where the rape happened still stands, and has been renamed Galaxy Lodge. The death row cellblock where the four men were held along with its electric chair chamber continued to be in use until 1976 when the electric chair was retired and executions began to be by firing squad. The electric chair used in the execution was destroyed by fire but was salvaged and repaired for a museum exhibit. A new death house was built to house lethal injection executions and the chair is now displayed in the present death house, which functions as the Bilibid Museum. The death row cellblock has been converted to a maximum security compound.

The presiding judge, Lourdes Paredes San Diego, was against the death penalty for most of her life but only supported it as a last resort. In an interview on her daughter Jo's radio show, she stated "Ija (my daughter), in the Philippines, rape is punishable by death". San Diego was later appointed as the first female chief justice of the Court of Appeals, where she served until her retirement. She held a teaching position at the Philippine Women's University until her death. A street in Quezon City near EDSA and Kamias Road was named in honor of her.

In popular culture 
The incident was made into a film in 1994 called "The Maggie de la Riva Story (God... Why Me?). The titular character was played by actress Dawn Zulueta. Her niece, singer Ana Rivera, played her sister Medy de la Riva-Suba, and Jaime José was played by the late Miguel Rodrguez. De la Riva herself appeared in the films as a cameo.

References 

Rape in the Philippines
Rape in the 1960s
1967 in the Philippines